Santo António is a civil parish in the western portion of the Macau Peninsula of Macau. It has the highest population density in Macau (98,776 persons per km²).

This parish was one of five in the former Municipality of Macau, one of Macau's two municipalities that were abolished on 31 December 2001 by Law No. 17/2001, following the 1999 transfer of sovereignty over Macau from Portugal to China. While their administrative functions have since been removed, these parishes are still retained nominally.

It is north of the parish of Sé, south of Nossa Senhora de Fátima parish, west of São Lázaro parish, and east of the Inner Harbor (Porto Interior).

Description
The entire area is reclaimed from the sea.

Population statistics as of 2006:
 Area: 1.1. km² (16.4% of the peninsula)
 Population: 109,000 (31.7% of the peninsular population)

It includes:
 Sha Gong (沙崗)
 San Kio (新橋)
 Patane (沙梨頭)

Hotels
 Sofitel Macau At Ponte 16

Healthcare
The parish houses a private hospital, Kiang Wu Hospital.

The Macau government operates the Centro de Saúde Macau Norte (筷子基衛生中心 meaning "Fai Chi Kei Health Center") in Santo António, near Bairro Fai Chi Kei.

Education

Primary and secondary schools
All primary and secondary schools in Santo António are private.
 In the tuition-free school network:
 Colégio Mateus Ricci: One secondary campus and one primary/kindergarten campus
 Kwong Tai Middle School branch campus
  - Preschool through secondary school
 Sacred Heart Canossian College English section - Primary and secondary school
 Hou Kong Middle School Macau kindergarten and primary school campuses
 Escola Shá Lei Tau Cham Son - Preschool and primary school
  - Primary and secondary school
  - Preschool through senior high school
 Escola da Sagrada Família - Preschool and primary school
  - Santo António - Operated by the Union for Development (Associação Geral dos Operarios de Macau)

 Not in the tuition-free network:
 Chan Sui Ki Perpetual Help College (Branch) - Preschool and primary school

Former schools:
 Tuition-free network:
 Escola do Santíssimo Rosário - Preschool through junior high school

Public libraries

Macao Public Library operates three two branches in the parish:
 Patane Library (Biblioteca do Patane; 沙梨頭圖書館)
 It occupies seven buildings first built in the 1930s and renovated by the Macau Cultural Affairs Bureau. The library itself opened on 9 December 2016.
 Red Market Library (Biblioteca do Mercado Vermelho; 紅街市圖書館)
 It occupies  of a former post office, and first opened on 24 July 2012.
 Wong Ieng Kuan Library in Luis de Camões Garden (Biblioteca de Wong Ieng Kuan no Jardim Luis de Camões; 白鴿巢公園黃營均圖書館)
It is one of several libraries built with funding by Wong Ieng Kuan, a Chinese Peruvian.

Tourist attractions
 Camões Grotto
 Casa Garden
 Fire Services Museum
 Mount Fortress
 Macau Protestant Chapel
 Museum of Macau
 Museum of Sacred Art and Crypt
 Na Tcha Temple
 Old Protestant Cemetery
 Ruins of St. Paul's

See also
 List of the most densely populated administrative units in the world

References

External links

"Parishes." Cartography and Cadastre Bureau. Portuguese version, Traditional Chinese version

Freguesias of Macau
Macau Peninsula